Sagra may refer to:
Sagra, Uttar Pradesh, a village in Domariaganj, Uttar Pradesh, India
Sagra, Diamond Harbour, a village in South 24 Parganas district, West Bengal, India
Sagra, Russia, a rural locality (a settlement) in Sverdlovsk Oblast, Russia
Sagra, Alicante, a municipality in the province of Alicante, Valencian Community, Spain
La Sagra, a Spanish comarca
Sagra (festival), an Italian local festival, very often involving food
The Sagra del gelato ice-cream festival held in Massa Martana, Italy
Sagra Musicale Malatestiana,  a music festival held in Rimini, Italy
Sagra di San Michele, an abbey in the Italian Val di Susa
the Sagra River in ancient Italy, site of the Battle of the Sagra
Sagra (beetle), a genus of beetles